Karasf Rural District is in the Central District of Khodabandeh County, Zanjan province, Iran. At the National Census of 2006, its population was 11,263 in 2,655 households. There were 12,957 inhabitants in 3,546 households at the following census of 2011. At the most recent census of 2016, the population of the rural district was 7,998 in 2,382 households. The largest of its 27 villages was Hesar, with 1,688 people.

References 

Khodabandeh County

Rural Districts of Zanjan Province

Populated places in Zanjan Province

Populated places in Khodabandeh County